Teton National Forest was first established by the General Land Office on February 22, 1897 as the Teton Forest Reserve with .  A commission was established in 1896 to plan for a system of national forest reserves, recommending an expansion of the territory protected by the Yellowstone Timberland Reserve. President Grover Cleveland's 1897 proclamation established a protected area encompassing the northern end of Jackson Hole, extending from the south boundary of the Yellowstone Forest Reserve south to the area of the Gros Ventre River, and from the Idaho border in the west to the area of the Continental Divide in the east. Much of this area would eventually be incorporated into Grand Teton National Park. In 1902 the southern porion of the Yellowstone reserve was added, while the Teton Reserve was greatly expanded to the south and east while excluding the southern portion of Jackson Hole around the town of Jackson.

In 1973 Teton National Forest was administratively combined with Bridger National Forest, creating Bridger-Teton National Forest. In descending order of land area, Teton National Forest is located in parts of Teton, Sublette, Park, Fremont, and Lincoln counties. It is now administrated as part of the Bridger-Teton National Forest from its headquarters in Jackson, but there are local ranger district offices in Jackson and Moran. The forest contains both the Gros Ventre Wilderness and the Teton Wilderness, both officially designated by the National Wilderness Preservation System.

References

External links
Forest History Society
Listing of the National Forests of the United States and Their Dates (Forest History Society website) Text from Davis, Richard C., ed. Encyclopedia of American Forest and Conservation History. New York: Macmillan Publishing Company for the Forest History Society, 1983. Vol. II, pp. 743-788.

Former National Forests of Wyoming
Grand Teton National Park
Protected areas of Teton County, Wyoming
1897 establishments in Wyoming
Protected areas established in 1897
1973 disestablishments in Wyoming
Protected areas disestablished in 1973